The International Meteor Organization (IMO) was formally founded in 1988 from predecessor gatherings over many years. IMO has several hundred members and was created in response to an ever-growing need for international cooperation on amateur and professional meteor work. The collection of meteor observations by several methods from all around the world ensures the comprehensive study of meteor showers and their relation to comets and interplanetary dust.

IMO publishes a bimonthly journal called WGN and holds an annual International Meteor Conference (IMC) in September.

See also
American Meteor Society
List of astronomical societies
Meteoritics

Notes

References

External links
 
 
 
 
 

Astronomy societies
Scientific organisations based in Belgium
International scientific organizations
Space science organizations